Wildfire is a 2020 Irish drama thriller film directed by Cathy Brady. It is about two reunited sisters who discover secrets from their mother's past. It was acquired by Modern Films for distribution in the UK.

The film holds  approval rating on Rotten Tomatoes. The critical consensus on Rotten Tomatoes reads, "Anchored by the believable bond between its leads, Wildfire tells a heartfelt and realistic story of sisters peering into their family's past." It was in the Great 8 Showcase at the Cannes Film Festival and debuted in the Discovery Showcase at the 2020 Toronto International Film Festival. It won the IWC Schaffhausen Filmmaker Bursary Award at the London BFI Film Festival. The award is worth £50k, for outstanding first or second time UK writer, director or writer/director presenting work at the BFI London Film Festival.

Nika McGuigan was posthumously honoured with the Lead Actress - Film award at the Irish Film & Television Academy (IFTA) Film & Drama Awards on for her final performance in this film.

References

External links
 
 

2020 films
2020 thriller drama films
English-language Irish films
2020s English-language films